Sarah Purcell is an American historian. She is the L.F. Parker Professor of History at Grinnell College in Grinnell, Iowa.

Purcell did a history BA at Grinnell College in 1992, and an AM and PhD at Brown University, in 1993 and 1997 respectively. She taught at Central Michigan University until 2000, when she went to Grinnell. She has specialised in American history, particularly Civil War and military topics.

Books 
 Sealed with Blood: War, Sacrifice, and Memory in Revolutionary America
 Eyewitness History: The Early American Republic.
 The Encyclopedia of Battles in North America, 1517-1915 (Best of Reference award winner, New York Public Library, 2000)
 Critical Lives: The Life and Work of Eleanor Roosevelt.
 Spectacle of Grief: The Politics of Mourning and the U.S. Civil War.

References 

Year of birth missing (living people)
Living people
American women historians
20th-century American women writers
21st-century American women writers
20th-century American historians
21st-century American historians
Grinnell College alumni
Brown University alumni
Grinnell College faculty
Central Michigan University faculty